Mountelgonia lumbuaensis is a moth of the family Cossidae. It is found in the Mau Forest complex in the south-western highlands of Kenya. The habitat consists of both wet and dry Afromontane forest at high altitudes.

The wingspan is about 24 mm. The forewings are warm buff. The costal margin is sepia. The hindwings are glossy ivory yellow.

Etymology
The species is named after the locality Lumbua, Kenya.

References

Endemic moths of Kenya
Moths described in 2013
Mountelgonia
Moths of Africa